Members of the New South Wales Legislative Council between 1970 and 1973 were indirectly elected by a joint sitting of the New South Wales Parliament, with 15 members elected every three years. The most recent election was on 12 March 1970, with the term of new members commencing on 23 April 1970. The President was Sir Harry Budd.

References

See also
Third Askin ministry
Fourth Askin ministry
Fifth Askin ministry

Members of New South Wales parliaments by term
20th-century Australian politicians